The Alliance for Democracy and Progress was an alliance of political parties in Mali, that supported president Amadou Toumani Touré. In the 1 July and 22 July 2007 Malian parliamentary elections, the member parties of the alliance won 113 out of 160 seats.

Defunct political parties in Mali
Defunct political party alliances in Africa